Boutarfaya is a village in the commune of Timoudi, in Kerzaz District, Béchar Province, Algeria.

References

Neighbouring towns and cities

Populated places in Béchar Province